Brian Sacca (born 1978) is an American actor, writer, and producer from Lockport, NY who creates both digital media as well as traditional film/TV content. He is most recently known for playing Robbie Feinberg in The Wolf of Wall Street. He can also be seen in The Kings of Summer, Kroll Show, and United States of Tara.  Sacca also starred on the TBS scripted comedy Wrecked.

An alumnus of the Nichols School (Class of 1997), Sacca started his career as part of the comedy duo Pete and Brian with Peter Karinen. In 2007, they wrote and starred in the short film FCU: Fact Checkers Unit with Bill Murray. FCU was later developed into a web series starring Brian Sacca and Peter Karinen. It ran for two seasons. Sacca has written on a number of award shows, including the 63rd Primetime Emmy Awards.

Sacca is the younger brother of Silicon Valley investor Chris Sacca.

Filmography

References

External links
 
 
 

1978 births
Living people
American male film actors
American male television actors
21st-century American male actors
American television writers
American male television writers
Date of birth missing (living people)
Place of birth missing (living people)